Wolfram Goessling is a physician-scientist who specializes in oncology and gastroenterology. He is the Robert H. Ebert Professor of Medicine at Harvard Medical School and Chief of the Division of Gastroenterology at Massachusetts General Hospital. Goessling is also involved in the Harvard–MIT Program of Health Sciences and Technology (HST), where he is co-director with Emery N. Brown.

Career and personal life 
Goessling is a member of the Cancer Genetics Program and the Gastrointestinal Malignancies Program, both at the Dana-Farber/Harvard Cancer Center. He is also Advisory Dean of the Irving M. London Society for HST students. He has been hailed for his accessibility, compassion, and knowledge, even while fighting his own aggressive malignancy.

In 2013 Goessling was awarded the Irving M. London Teaching Award, together with Daniel Soloman.

He holds the Jules L. Dienstag, M.D. and Betty and Newell Hale Endowed Chair in Gastroenterology at Massachusetts General Hospital.

Goessling has been a longtime trumpeter for the Longwood Symphony Orchestra.

References 

Harvard Medical School faculty
Living people
American physicians
American scientists
Year of birth missing (living people)